BMH is a three letter abbreviation that could mean:

 Bengbu South railway station, China Railway telegraph code BMH
 Britas MöHippa 2022-11-20
 Benjamin Mkapa Hospital, located in Dodoma, Tanzania
 Big Momma's House, a 2000 comedy film starring Martin Lawrence and Nia Long
 Big Money Hustlas, a 1999 comedy film starring Detroit hip hop group Insane Clown Posse
 Bournemouth – ISO 3166-2:GB administrative division code GB-BMH
 Bournemouth railway station
 Boyer–Moore–Horspool algorithm, an algorithm for finding substrings in strings
 British Military Hospital (disambiguation), hospitals provided for military personnel; esp. in foreign countries
 British Motor Holdings, UK company created with the merger of Jaguar and BMC in 1966
 Bureau of Military History, Irish military archive
 Burst My Head, moniker for Music Producer BolaBMH
 Black Magic Holiday/Bank Monday Holiday, noise mongrels from Warminster, Wiltshire, UK